The Electoral Headhunter (international) or Koppensneller (Dutch) is a special type of Voting Advice Application (VAA), providing a voting advice for several elections such as province and national elections in the Netherlands, the 2014 Dutch European Parliament Elections and for the Presidential elections of 2012 in the USA.

Functionality 
Opposite to most other VAAs, it claims to focus on intuition rather than 'objective' statements about the views of political parties. The person should 'trust [his] feeling', choosing between faces of politicians, selecting the ones that appeal to him the most. From the choices, several conclusions are made about the person's political viewpoints.

No proof of claim 
Although the scientific sources such as articles in the Scientific American named on the site may be correct, the Electoral Headhunter/Koppensneller does not give proof that a voting advice could be extracted from merely choosing 'appealing faces'.

References 

Politics of the United States
Politics and technology
Elections